The Netherlands Football League Championship 1932–1933 was contested by 50 teams participating in five divisions. The national champion would be determined by a play-off featuring the winners of the eastern, northern, southern and two western football divisions of the Netherlands. Go Ahead won this year's championship by beating Feijenoord, Stormvogels, PSV Eindhoven and Velocitas 1897.

New entrants
Eerste Klasse East:
Promoted from 2nd Division: Enschedese Boys
Eerste Klasse North:
Promoted from 2nd Division: Sneek Wit Zwart
Eerste Klasse South:
Promoted from 2nd Division: Zeelandia Middelburg
Eerste Klasse West-I:
Moving in from West-II: ADO Den Haag, Feijenoord, FC Hilversum, VSV and ZFC
Promoted from 2nd Division: DHC
Eerste Klasse West-II:
Moving in from West-I: AFC Ajax, Sparta Rotterdam, Stormvogels, West Frisia and KFC
Promoted from 2nd Division: HFC Haarlem

Divisions

Eerste Klasse East

Eerste Klasse North

Eerste Klasse South

Eerste Klasse West-I

Eerste Klasse West-II

Championship play-off

References
RSSSF Netherlands Football League Championships 1898-1954
RSSSF Eerste Klasse Oost
RSSSF Eerste Klasse Noord
RSSSF Eerste Klasse Zuid
RSSSF Eerste Klasse West

Neth
Netherlands Football League Championship seasons
Neth